Fusion, or synthesis, is the process of combining two or more distinct entities into a new whole.

Fusion may also refer to:

Science and technology

Physics
Nuclear fusion, multiple atomic nuclei combining to form one or more different atomic nuclei and subatomic particles
Fusion power, power generation using controlled nuclear fusion reactions
Cold fusion, a hypothesized type of nuclear reaction that would occur at or near room temperature
Heat fusion, a welding process for joining two pieces of a thermoplastic material
Melting, or transitioning from solid to liquid form

Biology and medicine
 Binaural fusion, the cognitive process of combining the auditory information received by both ears
 Binocular fusion, the cognitive process in binocular vision of combining the visual information received by both eyes
 Cell fusion, a process in which several uninuclear cells combine to form a multinuclear cell
 Gene fusion, a genetic event and molecular biology technique
 Lipid bilayer fusion, a part of several cellular processes
 Spinal fusion, a surgical technique used to combine two or more vertebrae
 Tooth fusion, a dental abnormality in which two teeth are joined

Computing

Computing techniques
 Image fusion, a process of combining relevant information from two or more images into a single image
 Loop fusion, a compiler program-optimization transformation that replaces multiple loops with a single one
 Sensor fusion, the combining of sensory data from disparate sources

Application software
 Fusion 360, a 3D CAD, CAM and CAE program by Autodesk
 Blackmagic Fusion, a visual effects package
 BT Fusion, a defunct UK voice-over-IP service
 ColdFusion, a rapid application-development platform
 Lucidworks Fusion, a search engine platform
 NetObjects Fusion, a web design program

Middleware and operating system components
 Compiz Fusion, a community-maintained set of plugins for the Compiz Window Manager
 IBRIX Fusion, a parallel file system
 Oracle Fusion Middleware, a portfolio of standards-based software products that spans multiple services
 VMware Fusion, a virtual machine software product

Arts and media

Comics
 Fusion (Eclipse Comics)
 Fusion (Image Comics)
 Fusion (Marvel Comics), a name of two fictional supervillains
 Fusion (Marvel/Top Cow), a crossover between Marvel and Top Cow Productions

Dance
Fusion dance, a type of partner dance that combines two or more dance styles
NW Fusion Dance Company, located in Tigard, Oregon

Film and television
"Fusion" (Star Trek: Enterprise), a first-season episode of Star Trek: Enterprise
Fusion (TV channel), an American cable and satellite news channel
Dragon Ball Z: Fusion Reborn, the 15th movie in the Dragon Ball series

Gaming
 Cartoon Network Universe: FusionFall, a massively multiplayer online game released in 2009
 Dancing Stage Fusion, a 2004 music video game by Konami
 Fuzion, a merger of Interlock System and Hero System
 Metroid Fusion, a 2002 Game Boy Advance game
 Philadelphia Fusion, a E-sports gaming team
 Fusion video game, a 1988 shoot 'em up video game

Magazines
 Fusion (Kent State University)
 Fusion (music magazine), an American music magazine, 1967 to 1974
 Fusion Magazine (political magazine), founded and edited by Glenn Beck
 Fusion Magazine (scientific magazine), predecessor to 21st Century Science and Technology magazine

Music
 Fusion (Jimmy Giuffre 3 album), 1961
 Fusion (Jeremy Steig album), 1972
 Fusion (Sawthis album), 2006
 Fusion Festival, a music festival in Lärz, Germany
 Fusion, the former name of Guardian, a Christian rock band
 Jazz fusion, genre that combines rock and jazz, starting in 1960s

Businesses and organizations

Non-profit and political organizations
 Fusion Party, a name for multiple political parties in American history
 Fusion Energy Foundation, a defunct American non-profit think tank co-founded by Lyndon LaRouche in 1974
 Fusion International, an Australian-based Christian organisation
 Fusion of Haitian Social Democrats, a Haitian political party
 Fusion – Sarvodaya ICT4D Movement, Information and Communications Technology for Development, Sri Lanka

Sports teams
 Cleveland Fusion, a women's American football team in the NWFA
 Fort Wayne Fusion, Arena football team
 Miami Fusion, a professional soccer club in Fort Lauderdale
 Philadelphia Fusion, an American esports team

Other organizations
 Fusion Academy, a private alternative school in several U.S. cities
 Fusion Media Group, a division of Univision Communications

Law and politics

 Fusion of powers, a feature of some parliamentary forms of government
 Fusionism (politics), the combination of libertarianism and various types of conservatism
 Electoral fusion, an arrangement where two or more political parties support a common candidate
 Fusion of law and equity, combining the rules of equity and common law into one set of rules
 Fusion of the legal profession, the elimination of the distinction between barristers and solicitors

Products

 AMD Fusion, a combined microprocessor and GPU design, now branded as AMD Accelerated Processing Unit
 Ford Fusion (Americas), a mid-sized car produced by Ford Motor Company
 Ford Fusion (Europe), a mini MPV produced by Ford Motor Company
 Schumacher Fusion, a radio-controlled car
 Gillette Fusion, a safety razor by Gillette
 Fusion, a brand name of computer hardware used by Arctic

Other uses
 Fusion (phonetics), the merger of phonological features of two speech segments into one feature
 Fusion cuisine, the combination of elements of various culinary traditions
 Fusional language or inflected language, a type of language
 Information fusion, the merging of information from disparate sources

See also
Fuse (disambiguation)
Fusing (disambiguation)
Cold fusion (disambiguation)
Fission (disambiguation), opposite of fusion